Centrocardita is an extant genus of marine clams in the family Carditidae. It is also represented in the fossil record. It is sometimes treated as a subgenus of Glans.

Species 
 Centrocardita aculeata (Poli, 1795)
 Centrocardita akabana (Sturany, 1899)
 Centrocardita belcheri (Deshayes, 1854)
 Centrocardita donghaiensis (Xu, 2012)
 Centrocardita echinaria (Melvill & Standen, 1907)
 Centrocardita gunnii (Deshayes, 1854)
 Centrocardita hirasei (Dall, 1918)
 Centrocardita inquinata (Nicklès, 1955)
 Centrocardita millegrana (Nomura & Zinbo, 1934)
 Centrocardita pseudocardita (Poutiers, 1981)
 Centrocardita rosulenta (Tate, 1887)
 Centrocardita sagamiensis (Kuroda & Habe in Habe, 1961)
 Centrocardita soyoae (Habe, 1958)
 Centrocardita squamigera (Deshayes, 1832)

 Synonyms
 Centrocardita elegans (Réquien, 1848), synonym of Centrocardita aculeata
 Centrocardita pileolata Oliver & Holmes, 2004, synonym of Carditella pileolata

References

External links 
 Centrocardita at fossilworks
 Centrocardita at the World Register of Marine Species (WoRMS)

Carditidae
Bivalve genera